Minor Earth Major Sky (stylised as minor earth | major sky) is the sixth studio album by Norwegian band A-ha, released on 14 April 2000 by WEA.

Background and release
Following the release of A-ha's fifth studio album, Memorial Beach (1993), the band decided to go on a hiatus. In 1998, the band was invited to perform at the Nobel Peace Prize Concert. Paul Waaktaar-Savoy had written "Summer Moved On" especially for this performance. They also performed "The Sun Always Shines on T.V.". This performance was A-ha's comeback into the world of music and the band decided to return to the studio.

Almost the entire album was remixed by producer Niven Garland at the record company's insistence to make it more radio-friendly for the band's German market.

"Summer Moved On", "Minor Earth Major Sky" and "Velvet" were commercially released as singles. "I Wish I Cared" was an Internet download single, accompanied by an Internet-only music video—one of the first of its kind.

Backing vocals for the track "Velvet" were provided by Simone Larsen of Norwegian band D-Sound.

Reception

Critical reception

Jayne Howarth of The Birmingham Post gave the album a mixed review writing, "It was grown-up ballad stuff and a few attempts at light pop but it didn't work and some of the vocals were, frankly, strained. There were a couple of bright spots, apart from the opener – The Sun Never Shone That Day and I Wish I Cared – and although it was a grower, I fear the CD is condemned to stay on the CD shelf."

Commercial performance
Minor Earth Major Sky debuted at number one on the Norwegian Albums Chart, and became the band's first number one album in Germany. The album peaked at number 27 on the UK Albums Chart, but was not released in the U.S.
This album was certified platinum in Norway and Germany and gold in Austria, Spain and Switzerland.

Track listing

Notes
  signifies a co-producer
  signifies a remixer

Personnel

A-ha 
 Morten Harket – vocals
 Magne Furuholmen – keyboards, string arrangements 
 Paul Waaktaar-Savoy – guitars, string arrangements

Additional musicians 
 Sven Lindvall – bass (2, 13)
 Jørun Bøgeberg – bass (11)
 Frode Unneland – drums (1, 7)
 Per Lindvall – drums (3, 10, 13)
 Per Hillestad – drums (11)
 Kjetil Bjerkestrand – string arrangements
 Norwegian Radio Orchestra – strings
 Oslo Philharmonic Orchestra – strings
 Vertavo String Quartet – strings (11)
 Simone Eriksrud – vocals (3)
 Lauren Savoy – vocals (11)

Technical and Design 
 a-ha – arrangements 
 Jon Marius Aareskjold – engineer, Pro Tools operator
 Jan-Erik Kongshaug – engineer
 Ulf Holand – engineer 
 Niven Garland – mixing (1, 2, 3, 5, 7-13) 
 Andreas Herbig "Boogieman" – mixing (4, 6)
 Kjetil Bjerkestrand – Pro Tools operator
 Magne Furuholmen – art direction 
 Kjetil Try – art direction
 Henrik Haugen – logo artwork 
 Bjørn Opshal – photography

Charts

Weekly charts

Year-end charts

Certifications

References

External links
 

A-ha albums
2000 albums
Warner Music Group albums